The 1938 Northern Ireland general election was held on 9 February 1938.  Like all previous elections to the Parliament of Northern Ireland, it produced a large majority for the Ulster Unionist Party. The newly-formed Ulster Progressive Unionist Association came second in vote share, but won no seats.

Results

|}

Electorate: 825,101 (464,860 in contested seats); Turnout: 71.1% (330,355).

Seat changes

Votes summary

Seats summary

References
Northern Ireland Parliamentary Election Results 

Northern Ireland general election
1938
Northern Ireland general election
1938 elections in Northern Ireland